Chrysiptera springeri, commonly known as Springer's demoiselle, is a species of damselfish in the family Pomacentridae.

Taxonomy
The specific name honours the ichthyologist Victor G. Springer who collected the type in the Moluccas.

Description
It reaches 5.5 centimeters in length, and is variable in color.

Distribution and habitat
It is native to the western Pacific Ocean, where it occurs in the tropical waters of Indonesia and the Philippines.

References

External links
http://www.marinespecies.org/aphia.php?p=taxdetails&id=276843
 

springeri
Fish of Indonesia
Fish of the Philippines
Taxa named by Gerald R. Allen
Taxa named by Roger Lubbock
Fish described in 1976